Talap is a suburb of Kannur on NH 66 in Kerala in southern India. Talap is the nearest town or village in Kannur district. Whilst seen predominantly residential, Talap has many prominent educational and health institutions in Kannur. It is also famous for its cultural and religious heritage.

Education 
 SN Vidya Mandir Talap
 Chinmaya Balabhavan Talap
 Gem International Pre-School Talap
 Chinmaya Mission College Talap
 Wales College Of Science and Management
 Govt. UP School Talap
 A K G Memorial Co Operative College of Nursing Talap
 Govt.Talap Mixed UP School
 Chenginipadi School Talap
 Bharathiya Vidya Bhavan Talap

Health 
 Koyili Hospital Talap
 A.K.G Memorial Co-operative Hospital Talap
Chaithanya Hospital, Talap
 JJ Hospital Talap
 Kripa Nursing Home Talap
 MAKS International Institute of Medical Sciences Talap
 Madhavrao Scindia Ravu Hospital Talap
 Fathima Hospital Talap
 KIMST Hospital Talap
 KVM Ayurvedic hospital talap
 Asha lab
 Dr. P Mahesh scanning centre Talap
 Regional public health laboratory Talap kannur
 Ceyem Medilab Talap
 Jeeva medical lab Talap
 Metropolis Healthcare

Religion 
 Talap Shree Sundareswara Temple
 Talap Juma Masjid
 CSI Church
 Olachery Kavu Talap

Gallery 

Suburbs of Kannur